Gibson Southern High School is a public high school located in Fort Branch, Indiana.

Academics
Gibson Southern High School received the Indiana Four Star School Award for seven consecutive years.

Athletics

In 1974, Gibson Southern was originally a member of the Pocket Athletic Conference (PAC). In 1980, the school left the PAC to form the Big 8 Conference with 7 former Southern Indiana Athletic Conference schools, some of which were also once members of the PAC. In 1994, Gibson Southern left the Big 8 to rejoin the PAC. In 2020 the Pocket Athletic Conference expanded with Boonville, Mount Vernon, Princeton and Washington joining Forest Park, Gibson Southern, Heritage Hills, North Posey, Pike Central, Southridge, South Spencer, Tecumseh, and Tell City to make it a 13-team conference.

The school won state championships in softball in 2003, 2005 and 2015 and played in class AAAA in the sport from 2016 to 2021.

In 2021, the football team won their first state championship in school history.

See also
 List of high schools in Indiana

References

External links
 Gibson Southern High School Website
 Gibson Southern's Indiana Department of Education Profile

Public high schools in Indiana
High schools in Southwestern Indiana
Fort Branch, Indiana
Haubstadt, Indiana
Owensville, Indiana
Educational institutions established in 1974
Evansville metropolitan area
Pocket Athletic Conference
Big Eight Conference (IHSAA)
Schools in Gibson County, Indiana
1974 establishments in Indiana
Indiana articles needing attention